The 1970 Montana Grizzlies football team represented the University of Montana in the 1970 NCAA College Division football season as a member of the Big Sky Conference (Big Sky). The Grizzlies were led by fourth-year head coach Jack Swarthout and played their home games at Dornblaser Field.

Similar to the previous season, Montana won all ten games in the regular season (5–0 Big Sky, champions), but lost to North Dakota State in the Camellia Bowl in Sacramento in December. New conference member Northern Arizona was played this season, but not Boise State.

Defensive tackle Larry Miller was a third-team selection on the Little All-America team.

Schedule

References

External links
Montana Grizzlies football – 1970 media guide

Montana
Montana Grizzlies football seasons
Big Sky Conference football champion seasons
Montana Grizzlies football